Harald Steinhauser was an Italian luger who competed in the 1980s and early 1990s. A natural track luger, he won four medals at the FIL World Luge Natural Track Championships with two silvers in the doubles (1980, 1984) and two bronzes in the singles (1986, 1990).

Steinhauser also won two men's singles medal at the FIL European Luge Natural Track Championships with a silver in 1987 and a bronze in 1991.

References
Natural track European Championships results 1970-2006.
Natural track World Championships results: 1979-2007

Italian lugers
Italian male lugers
Year of birth missing (living people)
Living people
Sportspeople from Südtirol